Georgi Stoyanov (born 20 September 1947) is a Bulgarian modern pentathlete. He competed at the 1972 Summer Olympics.

References

1947 births
Living people
Bulgarian male modern pentathletes
Olympic modern pentathletes of Bulgaria
Modern pentathletes at the 1972 Summer Olympics
Sportspeople from Sofia